Moimenta may refer to the following places in Portugal:

 Moimenta da Beira, a municipality in the district of Viseu
 Moimenta (Cinfães), a civil parish in the municipality of Cinfães
 Moimenta (Terras de Bouro), a civil parish in the municipality of Terras de Bouro 
 Moimenta (Vinhais), a civil parish in the municipality of Vinhais
 Moimenta da Serra, a civil parish in the municipality of Gouveia
 Moimenta de Maceira Dão, a civil parish in the municipality of Mangualde